The Sudden Motion Sensor (SMS) is Apple's motion-based data protection system used in their notebook computer systems. Apple introduced the system January 1, 2005 in its refreshed PowerBook line, and included it in the iBook line July 26, 2005. Since that time, Apple has included the system in all of their non-SSD portable systems (since October 2006), now the MacBook Pro and MacBook Air.

With a triaxial accelerometer, the shock detector detects sudden acceleration, such as when the computer is dropped, and prepares the relatively fragile hard disk drive mechanism for impact. The system disengages the disk drive heads from the hard disk platters, preventing data loss and drive damage from a disk head crash. When the computer is stable, the drive operates normally again. A clicking noise can be heard when the sudden motion sensor activates. 

Broadly speaking, there have been two types of Sudden Motion Sensor. The sensor used in the G4-based laptops resolved shifts of 1/52 g (e.g. the dynamic range was close to 6-bit), while the sensor used in the current Intel-based laptops have an 8-bit resolution (250 scale divisions). In at least one model of Intel-based laptop, the MacBook Pro 15", Apple uses the Kionix KXM52-1050 three-axis accelerometer chip, with dynamic range of +/- 2g and bandwidth up to 1.5 kHz.

Aftermarket hardware problems

Among the MacBook and MacBook Pro community there have been several owners who installed aftermarket hard drives already equipped with anti-shock features who reported experiencing kernel panic errors whenever their unit was physically moved. This is believed to be due to a conflict between SMS and the new drive's anti-shock function. The Western Digital Scorpio series of notebook hard drives have been the most frequently reported as being susceptible to this problem. In practically all cases, disabling SMS alleviated this problem without any negative performance impact.

See also
Active hard-drive protection

External links
Apple.com: Sudden Motion Sensor disable instructions
SeisMac: Displays seismic data obtained from your SMS
AMSTracker by Amit Singh Command line utility for reading data from the Sudden Motion Sensor

Macintosh computers